Abadla is a town and commune in western Algeria, and capital of Abadla District, Béchar Province. It is located on the Oued Guir southwest of Béchar. According to the 2008 census its population is 13,636, up from 10,845 in 1998, and an annual growth rate of 2.4%, making it the most populated commune in Béchar Province apart from the capital.

It is a major centre for the Arab Doui-Menia tribe.

Geography

Abadla's location on the Oued Guir allows the growing of grain, facilitated in recent decades by the Djorf Torba dam located upstream. The area south of the town is mostly a flat plain, but there are several rocky hills found to the north of the town.

Climate

Abadla has a hot desert climate (Köppen climate classification BWh), with extremely hot summers and cool winters, and very little precipitation throughout the year.

Economy

Agriculture is the main industry in Abadla. There are a total of 23,350 date palms planted in the commune. As of 2009 there were 9,814 sheep, 2,777 goats, 1,939 camels, and 80 cattle. There were also 4000 chickens in 3 buildings.

Infrastructure and housing

100% of Abadla's population is connected to drinking water, 99% is connected to the sewerage system, and 83% (including 2,527 buildings) have access to electricity. There is one fuel service station in the town.

Abadla has a total of 2,594 houses, of which 1,982 are occupied, giving an occupation rate of 6.9 inhabitants per occupied building.

Transportation

Abadla is on the N6 national highway between Béchar to the northeast and Adrar to the southeast. The town of Méchraâ Houari Boumédienne is on the highway just to the south, while further to the south the towns of Igli, Béni Abbès and others can be accessed. The N50 highway leaves the N6 to the west just to the southwest of Abadla; it eventually leads to Tindouf, passing Hammaguir and Tinfouchy on the way.

Abadla was the terminus station of the Mediterranean-Niger-Railway.

Education

There are 7 elementary schools, with 88 classrooms including 61 in use. There are a total of 3,190 school students.

5.9% of the population has a tertiary education, and another 21.3% has competed secondary education. The overall literacy rate is 83.4%, and is 90.0% among males and 76.5% among females.

Health

Abadla has one polyclinic, 5 room care facilities, a maternity ward, 4 private pharmacies, and a medical operating theatre.

Culture

Abadla has a cinema with 200 seats.

Religion

Abadla has 4 operational mosques, with another 1 under construction.

Localities
The commune is composed of two localities:

Abadla
Ksi Ksou

References

Neighbouring towns and cities

Communes of Béchar Province
Béchar Province